Réservé aux indiens (Only Indians allowed) is a compilation of unreleased songs by French rocker Alain Bashung, issued in early 1993 on Barclay Records as part of the reissues of Bashung material on CD format. It contains 12 titles: 3 unreleased studio songs (including a cover), 6 instrumentals, 2 songs from original soundtracks and 1 traditional German song.

Track listing 

1993 albums
Barclay (record label) albums
Alain Bashung albums